The Guan languages are languages of the Kwa language family spoken by the Guan people in Ghana and Togo:

South Guan: Efutu, Cherepon, Gua, Larteh
North Guan: Chumburung–Tchumbuli, Dwang, Foodo, Kyode, Ginyanga, Gonja, Kplang, Krache, Nawuri, Nchumbulu, Nkonya–Nkami, Ntrapo, Vagala, Sissala
History Of Guan
[[Much of what we know of the Guans today has come down to us through archaeological research, language studies, and oral tradition. The word Guan refers to a group of distinct family of languages spoken by about 6% of Ghana’s population. Yet archaeological evidence suggests that the Guans are the undisputed aborigines of Ghana. The Guans were already settled in their villages, from the north to the coast, long before all the other tribal groups arrived in Ghana.

According to Guan speakers, they were originally savannah dwellers who lived in settlements in the semi-forest savannah areas, north of Ghana. Their ancestors had, however, long lived in central and coastal Ghana between 1500 BC and 500 BC. Booming trade in the commercial centre of Kumbi Saleh in the Ghana empire , between 750 AD and 1000 AD, had attracted them to move from their forest areas into the savannah fringes of northern Ghana, and to as far north as the present day Mossi region in Burkina Faso, to sell gold, pottery, and spices.
But, then, the Ghana empire began to crumble. It was attacked by Berber invaders from the Mediterranean north. The vassal states of the empire, to the south and east, also started to rebel against the ruling dynasty from the tenth century. At the same time, the region began to experience long spells of drought, and the Sahara desert began to expand southwards. It was time for the Guans to return to their ancestral homes, and by about 1000 AD they started to return southwards to NCHUMBURULAND.

For about two hundred years, the Guans enjoyed relative peace in NCHUMBURULAND, in the region of the confluence of the Black and While Volta rivers in present day Northern Ghana. However, from about 1300AD the Mossis, Dagombas and other northern tribal groups started migrating into northern Ghana, and established MAMPRUGU, DAGBON, and NANUM states to the east and south-east.
In about the 1550s, also, Mande warriors from the Songhay Empire invaded Nchumburuland. They were attracted there by the trade in gold. After conquering the land, they established the GONJA state which they extended well into BONO in present day Brong-Ahafo region in 1595. Between 1623 and 1666, the Gonjas took Daboya, and other important towns and villages including the market centre of SALAGA. The Gonja rulers came to speak the language of the Guans.

By this time, many Guan groups had already started migrating again southwards, setting up settlements along the Volta gorge. Others passed through the forest regions (now Asante) to the central and west coasts. The Larteh Guans migrated through Nigeria and Benin before arriving on the coast of now Ghana. But many Guan groups still remained at Nchumburu and in the AFRAM plains.
About this time, too, another group of Guans had established the powerful Kingdom of ATAARA OFINAM (1500-1701) in the AFRAM plains. Ataara Ofinam stretched as far west as to ADANSE. To the North-West, the Kingdom shared boundaries with BONOMANSO, and ended in the south on the west side of the Volta. The Capital , SENSEMANSO (Sremanso) was located at the site of present day ATIMPOKU.

The AKANS found the land inhabited when they emerged from ADANSE and ASUMEGYA in the 1600s. Tafo, near Kumasi, was even acclaimed to be an aboriginal Guan town up to the 1800s. However, after seven years of continuous attacks the AKANS of ADANSE finally broke up the Ataara Ofinam Kingdom and drove its King and people from the AFRAM Plains, across the Volta, to ATWODE, AKPAFU, LOLOBI, SANTRO-KOFI, BUEM NYAGBO, TAFI, AKPOSO, LOGBA, KPANDO ABANU, BUEM, NCHUMURU, and OKRE.

All this while, the coastal Guans had already settled in their towns and villages. A Dutch map of the Gold Coast, dated 25th December 1629, mentions the people of ABOERA, BONOE, EQUEA, and LATEBI.
Nana Kojo Gyan, Chief of Breman and Kyidomhene of EGUAFO Traditional Area proudly claims: ―we are Guans. We the Guans were the first people to migrate to the coastal area. Because we are Guans, the people call us EGUAFO.

Also, the people of APIREDE trace their origin to a place near BOLE in Gonja, from where they moved to CHAKOLI (near Nanjuro) in the present day NCHUMURULAND, and then to the AFRAM plains, the BIRIM basin, and to the foothills of the Akuapem mountains.

Again, according to the founding ancestor of BOSO, Obeng Kwatia, and the caretakers of the fetish Letsu, the BOSO people came from Eastern Gonja. The nuclear ANUM society also settled in the area of MAMPONG, Asante during their southward migration. The NKONYA ancestors claim they migrated from the north and, passing through KPEMBE (Salaga) and the vicinity of Atebubu, they first settled on the west coast near CAPE COAST.

Similarly, the LARTEH Guans, trekking in family groups, first left their ancestral home in NCHUMBURULAND and migrated south-eastwards through Benin and settled at SENYA, DOMFOE, EBIA, SEKETE, ENKPU (in Benin), before arriving at ALA west of the Volta estuary , and KONYON near the SHAI Hills.

 

The long trek through the region has been captured in this beautiful state lyrics:]]
Ethnologue and Glottolog also list Dompo, but according to Blench (1999), that is better left unclassified.

Proto-Guang has been reconstructed by Snider (1990).

See also
List of Proto-Guang reconstructions (Wiktionary)

References

Potou–Tano languages
Languages of Ghana
Languages of Togo
lartehassociation.co.UK